The Big Drift is in Glacier National Park, in the U.S. state of Montana and is an area along the Going-to-the-Sun Road where a large amount of winter snow can accumulate to depths of .  Located immediately east of Logan Pass, the westerly winds push snow over the crest of the Continental Divide onto the eastern flank of a long arête which extends south from Pollock Mountain. West of the divide, this arête is known as the Garden Wall.

As spring approaches, the region is surveyed by helicopter in preparation for snow removal that will be needed in order to reopen the Going-to-the-Sun Road for the summer season. By early April, snow removal crews working from either end of the  roadway have begun to ascend the steeper east and west slopes of the Lewis Range.

Survey crews identify avalanche hazards and help to locate the road using global positioning equipment. Large cornices are usually removed using explosives, then excavators and front-end loaders move the snow over the cliffsides or into dump trucks.

The entire Going-to-the-Sun Road takes about ten weeks to plow, even with equipment that can move 4,000 short tons of snow an hour. By the first of June of each year, the Logan Pass visitor center can usually be reached by vehicle from at least one side of the Continental Divide. In 2011, due to abnormally heavy late winter and early spring snowfall, the Going-to-the-Sun Road did not open until July 13th, which, at that time, was the latest opening since the road was built. That record was passed in 2022, when Going-to-the-Sun Road opened July 15, exactly 89 years since the road was dedicated.

References

Going-to-the-Sun Road
Glacier National Park (U.S.)
Lewis Range